Northtown or North Town may refer to:

Northtown (EP), 2014 EP by Shamir
A neighbourhood in North Las Vegas, Nevada known as North Town
North Las Vegas Airport, known as Northtown
North Town, Pleasureville, Kentucky
North Town (North Wootton hamlet), a hamlet in North Wootton, Somerset, UK
North Town (North Cadbury hamlet), a hamlet in North Cadbury, Somerset, UK

See also
Northtown Mall (disambiguation)